The Post Oak School is a private Montessori K-12 school with two campuses in Greater Houston. The preschool through elementary location is the Bissonnet Campus in Bellaire, Texas while the middle-high school is in the Museum District of Houston.

Founded in 1963, the school is a non-profit corporation. It is accredited by the Association Montessori Internationale (AMI) and the Independent Schools Association of the Southwest (ISAS). The school serves approximately 600 students, from 14 months through high school. The classroom levels are Infant Community, Primary, Lower Elementary, Upper Elementary, Middle School, and High School. Each level consists of children in three-year age ranges (apart from middle school which has a two-year age range, and high school consisting of a four-year range).

After the 1983 closure of Gordon Elementary School, a Houston Independent School District public school facility, as a neighborhood school, Gordon temporarily housed The Post Oak School.

K-8 campus
The K-8 campus in Bellaire had, in 2010,  of space. It began using the permanent Bellaire campus circa 1987.

In 2013 the school received a permit to expand from the Bellaire City Government.

Circa 2010 some residents in the nearby area complained about parking issues caused by traffic to and from the Post Oak School Bellaire campus and the adjacent Episcopal High School.

High school and Middle School
The Post Oak High School is a private Montessori high school in the Museum District, Houston. As of 2020 the director is Dr. James Quillin. The high school opened in the fall of 2012.

It is the first high school to open in the Museum District and it is the third Montessori high school in Houston.

Post Oak School began plans to establish a high school in 2010. In 2011 the school plans called for partnering with area medical institutions and museums. The school is in proximity to the Texas Medical Center. As of that year the tuition is $21,000 per year. The school plans to have a student population of 120. As of November 10, 2015 the high school has 51 students.

It also has a Middle School at the same campus in the Museum District, and it serves about 50 students as of Fall 2017.

Notable alumni
One well-known graduate of The Post Oak School is U.S. figure skater Becky Bereswill.

References

External links

The Post Oak School website
Post Oak High School

Independent Schools Association of the Southwest
Private high schools in Houston
Private schools in Houston
Private K-12 schools in Harris County, Texas
Educational institutions established in 1963
Bellaire, Texas
1963 establishments in Texas